Jon Reyes (born 1971 or 1972) is a Canadian politician and member of the Legislative Assembly of Manitoba. He currently serves as Minister of Labour and Immigration since January, 2023, and was previously the Minister of Advanced Education, Skills and Immigration, Minister of Economic Development and Jobs. From 2016 to 2021, Jon was appointed Special Envoy for Military Affairs for the Province of Manitoba.

A member of the Progressive Conservative Party of Manitoba, he was first elected in the 2016 provincial election as MLA for St. Norbert, and was re-elected in 2019 as MLA for Waverley. Reyes is the first Canadian born candidate of Filipino descent elected to the legislature in Manitoba.

Early life and education
Born and raised in Winnipeg, Manitoba around 1972, Reyes served 10 years in the Canadian Forces in both the Communication Reserves and the regular force with the Royal Canadian Navy (RCN). As a reservist, he was awarded the Special Service Medal (NATO) while serving at CFB Lahr in Germany. Reyes served with the RCN until 2000 as a Naval Combat Information Operator and then as an instructor at Canadian Forces Fleet School Pacific, located at CFB Esquimalt on Vancouver Island, British Columbia.

After his military career, Reyes went on to pursue a Bachelor of Commerce in Entrepreneurial Management at Royal Roads University in Victoria, British Columbia. After a brief career as a civil servant in the federal government, Reyes opened two small businesses with his wife Cynthia, which they owned and operated for sixteen years.

In 2010, Reyes founded Manitoba Filipino Business Council (MFBC) and served as the organization's first president until 2015. During his tenure as President of MFBC, he helped develop stronger trade ties between Canada and the Philippines. He has also served as a former member of the Manitoba Football Officials Association and as a support crew member for the Canadian Football League.

Reyes was a director of the Kidney Foundation of Canada - Manitoba Branch from 2013 until 2016, where he initiated the Filipino Kidney Health Initiative . He was also named to the Royal Canadian Mounted Police (RCMP) Commanding Officer's Cultural Diversity Advisory Committee in 2015 .

Political career
Reyes defeated incumbent NDP MLA Dave Gaudreau in the 2016 election and was subsequently appointed the Special Envoy for Military Affairs (SEMA) by Premier Brian Pallister.

In his role as SEMA, Reyes, a former member of the Canadian Armed Forces, was instrumental in gathering feedback from CAF personnel stationed in Manitoba on how to improve provincial government services offered to CAF personnel on their relocation to Manitoba.

On May 10, 2017, Reyes was named to the Fiscal Responsibility Committee of Cabinet, a committee tasked to examine priority matters of the Government of Manitoba related to fiscal and budgetary responsibility, which included strategic transformation priorities, providing oversight for key transformation projects identified in the Fiscal Performance Review and assuming responsibility for other strategic initiatives as directed by Treasury Board or Cabinet.

Reyes was appointed President of the Manitoba Branch of the Assemblée parlementaire de la Francophonie (APF) in March 2018 and met with provincial and territorial representatives to address the state of Francophone affairs in the Province of Manitoba, at the 34th Session of the APF Regional Assembly in Quebec City on July 10, 2018.

He has also represented the Province of Manitoba at the inaugural Seamless Canada Meeting at the Canadian Forces Staff College in Toronto held on June 27, 2018 and the second Seamless Canada Meeting in Ottawa on December 5, 2018, where he met with other provincial/territorial representatives to share a compilation of initiatives and services already in place for Manitoba's military community.

On, December 6, 2018, Reyes was named to the Economic Growth Committee of Cabinet, a committee which oversees a whole-of-government approach to growing the provincial economy.

The St. Norbert constituency was abolished for the 2019 provincial election, and Reyes sought election in the newly formed constituency of Waverley. He won with approximately 50 percent of the vote.

Personal life
Reyes is married to his wife Cynthia and has two children: Reyna, a daughter, and Miguel, a son. They also have two Alaskan Malamutes named Seger and Burkie.

He has been a member of the Knights of Columbus since 2013.

On January 8, 2022, Reyes was heavily criticized for posting a photo of his wife shoveling their driveway after she finished a 12-hour shift as a nurse working during the Covid-19 pandemic. His wife later defended him.

References

1970s births
Living people
Politicians from Winnipeg
Progressive Conservative Party of Manitoba MLAs
Canadian civil servants
Canadian Roman Catholics
Royal Canadian Navy personnel
Royal Roads University alumni
Canadian politicians of Filipino descent
21st-century Canadian politicians
Year of birth missing (living people)